Parasaurolophini is a tribe of derived corythosaurian lambeosaurine hadrosaurids that are native to Asia, and North America. It is defined as everything closer to Parasaurolophus walkeri than to Lambeosaurus lambei. It currently contains Adelolophus (from Utah), possibly Angulomastacator (from Texas), Charonosaurus (from China), Parasaurolophus (from Utah, New Mexico, China and Alberta) and Tlatolophus (from Mexico).

See also
 Timeline of hadrosaur research

References

Lambeosaurines